Sigismund II Augustus (1 August 1520 – 7 July 1572) was King of Poland and Grand Duke of Lithuania, the son of Sigismund I the Old, whom Sigismund II succeeded in 1548. He was the first ruler of the Polish–Lithuanian Commonwealth and the last male monarch from the Jagiellonian dynasty.

Sigismund was the only son of Italian-born Bona Sforza and Sigismund the Old. From the beginning he was groomed and extensively educated as a successor. In 1529 he was crowned vivente rege while his father was still alive. Sigismund Augustus continued a tolerance policy towards minorities and maintained peaceful relations with neighbouring countries, with the exception of the Northern Seven Years' War which aimed to secure Baltic trade. Under his patronage, culture flourished in Poland; he was a collector of tapestries from the Low Countries and collected military memorabilia as well as swords, armours and jewellery. Sigismund Augustus' rule is widely considered as the apex of the Polish Golden Age; he established the first regular Polish navy and the first regular postal service in Poland, known today as Poczta Polska. In 1569 he oversaw the signing of the Union of Lublin between Poland and the Grand Duchy of Lithuania, which formed the Polish–Lithuanian Commonwealth and introduced an elective monarchy.

Sigismund Augustus married three times; his first wife, Elizabeth of Austria, died in 1545 at just eighteen. He was then involved in several relationships with mistresses, the most famous being Barbara Radziwiłł, who became Sigismund's second wife and Queen of Poland in spite of his mother's disapproval. The marriage was deemed scandalous and was fiercely opposed by the royal court and the nobility. Barbara died five months after her coronation, presumably due to ill health, however, rumours circulated that she was poisoned. Sigismund finally wedded Catherine of Austria, but remained childless throughout his life.

Sigismund Augustus was the last male member of the Jagiellons. Following the death of his sister Anna in 1596 the Jagiellonian dynasty came to an end.

Early life

Sigismund Augustus was born in Kraków on 1 August 1520 to Sigismund I the Old and his wife, Bona Sforza of Milan. His paternal grandparents were Casimir IV Jagiellon, King of Poland, and Elizabeth of Austria. Sigismund's maternal grandparents, Gian Galeazzo Sforza and Isabella of Aragon, daughter of King Alfonso II of Naples, both ruled the Duchy of Milan until Sforza's suspicious death in 1494.

Throughout his youth, Sigismund Augustus was under the careful watch of his mother, Bona. Being the only legitimate male heir to the Polish throne throughout his father's reign, he was well educated and taught by the most renowned scholars in the country. It was also his mother's wish to name her only son Augustus, after the first Roman Emperor Gaius Octavius Augustus. However, this decision was met with Sigismund the Old's strong disapproval, who hoped for a lineage of Sigismunds on the Polish throne. Consequently, it was established that the child will bear two names to settle the conflict. The tradition of adopting Augustus as a second or middle name was also observed during the coronation of Stanisław Antoni Poniatowski who became King Stanisław II Augustus in 1764.

In 1530, the ten-year-old Sigismund Augustus was crowned by Primate Jan Łaski as co-ruler alongside his father, in accordance with the vivente rege law. Sigismund the Old hoped to secure his son's succession to the throne and maintain the Jagiellonian dynasty's position in Poland. The move was crucial to silence the members of nobility who were against the Jagiellons and viewed the action as a step towards absolutism. The law was officially abolished by the Henrician Articles, or the new constitution adopted between nobles and the newly elected king Henry of Valois in 1573.

Sigismund Augustus began his reign as the Grand Duke of the Grand Duchy of Lithuania in 1544 and initially opposed the Polish–Lithuanian union, thus hoping to leave his throne to his heirs.

First marriage

When Sigismund Augustus was co-crowned, Chancellor Krzysztof Szydłowiecki organized a preliminary marriage treaty between the young king and Elizabeth of Austria, daughter of Emperor Ferdinand I. The marriage was signed on 10–11 November 1530 in Poznań, however, the arrangement was delayed by Queen Bona Sforza, who detested the new bride. The treaty was renewed on 16 June 1538 in Wrocław by Johannes Dantiscus and the betrothal ceremony took place on 17 July 1538 in Innsbruck. Bona continued to lobby against the marriage and instead proposed Margaret of France to potentially form an alliance with the French against the Habsburgs.

On 5 May 1543, Elizabeth's escorted convoy entered Kraków and was greeted with enthusiasm by both the nobles and the townsfolk. The same day 16-year-old Elizabeth married 22-year-old Sigismund Augustus, whom she met for the first time shortly before marriage vows. The ceremony was performed at the Wawel Cathedral and the wedding continued for two weeks. Bona began to plot against the new queen. As a result, the newly wedded couple decided to reside in Vilnius, far from the royal court.

Despite the initial euphoria demonstrated by royal subjects, the marriage was unsuccessful from the very beginning. Sigismund Augustus did not find Elizabeth attractive and continued to have extramarital affairs with several mistresses, the most famous being Barbara Radziwiłł. Elizabeth was also known to be timid, meek and apprehensive due to strict upbringing. The young and garrulous king was also repulsed by Elizabeth's newly diagnosed epilepsy and subsequent seizures. Only Sigismund the Old and some nobles showed compassion towards the new Queen, who was disregarded by her husband and scorned by Bona. Sigismund Augustus was indifferent to her health condition; when the seizures continued to intensify he abandoned Elizabeth and returned to Kraków to collect her dowry. He also sent for Ferdinand's doctors to travel the long distance from Vienna knowing that Elizabeth was ailing and deteriorating fast. She eventually died unattended and exhausted from the epileptic attacks on 15 June 1545 at the age of 18.

Second marriage
From the outset of his reign, Sigismund Augustus came into collision with the country's privileged nobility, who had already begun curtailing the power of the great families. The ostensible cause of the nobility's animosity to the King was his second marriage, secretly contracted before his accession to the throne, with the Lithuanian, Calvinist and former mistress, Barbara Radziwiłł, the daughter of Hetman Jerzy Radziwiłł. The marriage was announced by the king himself on 2 February 1548 in Piotrków Trybunalski.

The young and beautiful Barbara was despised by Queen Bona, who attempted to annul the marriage at any cost. The agitation was also abundant at Sigismund's first Sejm (parliament) sitting on 31 October 1548 where the deputies threatened to renounce their allegiance unless the new king repudiated Barbara. The nobles portrayed Barbara as an opportunistic prostitute that charmed the king for her own benefit. That perception was shared with Bona Sforza, who decisively eliminated all her rivals by any means to stay in power. The young monarch even considered abdicating. By 1550, when Sigismund summoned his second Sejm, the nobles had begun to be in his favor; the nobility was rebuked by Marshal Piotr Kmita Sobieński, who accused them of attempting to unduly diminish the legislative prerogatives of the Polish Crown. Furthermore, Bona was removed from Wawel and sent to Mazovia where she established her own small courtly entourage.

Unlike her predecessor, Barbara was disliked by the royal court and led a more secluded life with Sigismund Augustus, who was deeply in love with her. On the other hand, she was ambitious, intelligent, perceptive and had an exemplar taste in fashion. She always wore precious pearl necklaces when sitting for portraits. The mutual admiration between Sigismund and Barbara made the relationship "one of the greatest love affairs in Polish history". While still married to Elizabeth, Sigismund Augustus ordered the construction of a secret passage connecting the Royal Castle in Vilnius with the nearby Radziwiłł Palace so that the couple could meet frequently and discreetly.

Due to her unpopularity in Poland, Barbara often expressed her wish to reside permanently in the Grand Duchy of Lithuania. To ease the situation, Sigismund Augustus provided a luxurious lifestyle and expensive gifts for his wife at Wawel Castle since her arrival in Kraków on 13 February 1549. The monarch also granted Barbara several provinces to administer and provide income. Although ambitious and bright, she showed lack of interest in political life, but had some influence over decisions made by Sigismund. This also caused an uproar among the nobility. To avoid an armed rebellion, Sigismund was forced to form an alliance with his former father-in-law, Emperor Ferdinand I. This allowed for Barbara's coronation as Queen of Poland on 7 December 1550 by Primate Mikołaj Dzierzgowski. Queen Bona eventually succumbed to her son's demand and accepted the marriage.

Since the day Sigismund and Barbara met, she complained of poor health, particularly stomach and abdominal pain. After the coronation her condition deteriorated rapidly. She was tormented by strong fever, diarrhea, nausea and lack of appetite. After careful observation by hired medics, a lump was discovered on her stomach filled with pus. Sigismund Augustus gravely despaired and sent for doctors and even folk healers from the entire country. He personally tended to his sick wife despite her foul smell and dedicated himself when necessary; the king hoped to take Barbara to the hunting castle at Niepołomice and ordered to demolish the small city gate so her carriage could pass freely. However, Barbara died on 8 May 1551 in Kraków after continuous pain and agony. It was her dying wish that she'd be buried in Lithuania, her homeland. The body was transported to Vilnius Cathedral, where she was finally buried on 23 June next to Elizabeth of Austria. Her death was a major blow to Sigismund; he often attended her coffin on foot while being transported to Vilnius in hot weather. Sigismund also became more serious and reserved; he avoided balls, temporarily renounced his mistresses and dressed black until death.

The cause of Barbara's death is debatable. Her opponents and family members suggested sexually transmitted diseases due to a number of affairs she had before marrying Sigismund. There were also persistent rumors that she was poisoned by Queen Bona Sforza, who had a long history of eliminating her rivals or enemies quickly and efficiently. However, contemporary historians and experts agree on cervical or ovarian cancer.

Third marriage

The death of Queen Barbara Radziwiłł, five months after her coronation and under distressing circumstances, compelled Sigismund to contract a third, purely political union with his first cousin, the Austrian archduchess Catherine, to avoid an Austro-Russian alliance. She was also the sister of his first wife, Elizabeth, who had died within a year of her marriage to him, before his accession. Catherine, unlike previous queens, was considered dull and obese. Sigismund Augustus found her immensely unattractive despite accepting the marriage and organizing a pompous wedding ceremony on 30 July 1553. On the other hand, Catherine showed resentment towards Sigismund because of how he treated her sister and first wife, Queen Elizabeth. She accused him of negligence and indifference during her sudden illness, which caused premature death. The correspondence between the two remained purely formal and political for the remainder of their lives.

Since her coronation, Catherine acted as Austria's puppet at the Polish court; she was tasked with espionage and obtaining important information for the benefit of the Habsburgs. Sigismund Augustus was aware of the scheme, but, by marrying Catherine, he obtained a promise from Austria to stay neutral and abandon plans with Russia. This neutrality was undermined by Catherine's actions, who followed her father's policy and objected the return of John Sigismund Zápolya and Isabella Jagiellon (Sigismund's sister) to Hungary. She would conspire with the Habsburg envoys prior to an audience with the king. She would also dictate what and how the envoys should express their views. When Sigismund Augustus found out of Catherine's intrigues, he sent her to Radom and excluded from political life.

As Sigismund lost all hope of children by his third bride; he was the last male Jagiellon in the direct line so the dynasty was threatened with extinction. He sought to remedy this by adultery with two of the most beautiful of his countrywomen, Barbara Giza and Anna Zajączkowska but was unable to impregnate either of them. The Sejm was willing to legitimize, and acknowledge as Sigismund's successor, any male heir who might be born to him; however, the King remained childless.

The King's marriage was a matter of great political import to Protestants and Catholics alike. The Polish Protestants hoped that he would divorce and remarry and thus bring about a breach with Rome at the very crisis of the religious struggle in Poland. He was not free to remarry until Queen Catherine's death on 28 February 1572, but he followed her to the grave less than six months later.

Health and final years

Unlike his father, Sigismund Augustus was more frail and sickly. Shortly before turning 50, his health rapidly declined. Being involved in many affairs and holding a large number of mistresses, historians agree that the king had venereal disease which caused him to be infertile. At 16, he also contracted malaria which further contributed to his inability of producing any offspring. By 1558 Sigismund had gout and since 1568 he also suffered from kidney stones, which triggered immense pain. He employed numerous medics, healers or even quack doctors and imported expensive ointments from Italy. By the end of his life, the king was losing teeth and vigour, possibly due to tuberculosis. Antonio Maria Graziani recalls that Sigismund was unable to keep standing without a cane when greeting Cardinal Giovanni Francesco Commendone.

During spring of 1572, Sigismund Augustus became feverish. Untreated tuberculosis made him feeble and impotent, but he was able to travel to his private retreat in Knyszyn. While at Knyszyn, he corresponded with his diplomats and nobles, highlighting that he was feeling well and hoped to recover. Great Marshal Jan Firlej denied these claims and reported that the king was bleeding severely due to consumption and was troubled by pain in the chest and lumbar.

Sigismund died in Knyszyn on 7 July 1572 at 6 in the afternoon, surrounded by a group of senators and envoys. The official cause of death given by the medics was consumption. His body placed on a catafalque and remained at the nearby Tykocin Castle until 10 September 1573 when it was transported back to Kraków through Warsaw. After transporting the remains of Barbara Radziwiłł from Kraków to Vilnius, Sigismund was building a church in the Vilnius Castle Complex which should have served as his family's mausoleum, however it was still uncompleted in 1572. Consequently, he was laid to rest at the Wawel Cathedral on 10 February 1574. The stately funeral ceremony, attended by his sister Anna Jagiellon, was the last spectacle of its kind in the Kingdom of Poland. No other Polish monarch was buried with such pomp and splendour. His death introduced an elective monarchy in Poland which lasted until the final partition at the end of the 18th century.

Sigismund Augustus was the last male member of the Jagiellonian dynasty. The death of his childless sister, Anna, in 1596 marked the end of the dynasty.

In addition to his family connections, Sigismund II Augustus was allied to the Habsburgs as member of the Order of the Golden Fleece.

Reign

Sigismund's reign was marked by a period of temporary stability and external expansion. He witnessed the bloodless introduction of the Protestant Reformation into Poland and Lithuania, and the peero-cratic upheaval that placed most political power in the hands of the Polish nobility; he saw the collapse of the Knights of the Sword in the north, which led to the Commonwealth's acquisition of Livonia as a Lutheran duchy and the consolidation of Turkey's power in the southeast. A less imposing figure than his father, the elegant and refined Sigismund II Augustus was nevertheless an even more effective statesman than the stern and majestic Sigismund I the Old.

Sigismund II possessed to a high degree the tenacity and patience that seem to have characterized all the Jagiellons, and he added to these qualities a dexterity and diplomatic finesse. No other Polish king seems to have so thoroughly understood the nature of the Polish Sejm and national assembly. Both the Austrian ambassadors and the papal legates testify to the care with which he controlled his nation. According to diplomats, everything went as Sigismund wished and he seemed to know everything in advance. He managed to obtain more funds from the Sejm than his father ever could, and at one of the parliament sittings he won the hearts of the assembled envoys by unexpectedly appearing in a simple grey coat of a Mazovian lord. Like his father, a pro-Austrian by conviction, he contrived even in this respect to carry with him the nation, often distrustful of the Germans. He also avoided serious complications and skirmishes with the powerful Turks.

Livonia

During Sigismund Augustus' reign, Livonia was in political turmoil. His father, Sigismund I, permitted Albert of Prussia to introduce the Protestant Reformation and secularize the southern part of the Teutonic Order State. Albert then established Europe's first Protestant state in the Duchy of Prussia in 1525, but under Polish suzerainty. However, his efforts to introduce Protestantism to the Livonian Brothers of the Sword in the northernmost part of the region was met with fierce resistance and divided the Livonian Confederation. When Albert's brother Wilhelm and Archbishop of Riga attempted to implement a Lutheran church order in his diocese, the Catholic estates rebelled and arrested both Wilhelm and his bishop coadjutor, Duke Christopher of Mecklenburg.

As Prussia was a tributary state of the Polish Crown, Sigismund Augustus, a Catholic, was forced to intervene in favour of Protestant Albert and his brother Wilhelm. In July 1557 the Polish forces left for Livonia. The armed intervention proved to be successful; the Catholic Livonians surrendered and signed the Treaty of Pozvol on 14 September 1557. The agreement placed most Livonian territories under Polish protection and de facto became part of Poland. Gotthard Kettler, the last Master of the Order, was granted the newly established Duchy of Courland and Semigallia. Wilhelm was restored to his former position as archbishop on Sigismund's demand, with the Lutheran church order being enacted.

The incorporation of Courland into the Polish sphere of influence created an alliance which threatened Russia's plans on expanding into the Baltic coast. Sigismund directed the alliance against Ivan the Terrible to protect lucrative trade routes in Livonia, thus creating a new valid casus belli against the Russian Tsardom. On 22 January 1558, Ivan invaded the Baltic states and started the Livonian War, which lasted 25 years until 1583. Russia's eventual defeat in the war legally partitioned Livonia between Poland (Latvia, southern Estonia) and Sweden (central-northern Estonia). The Polish sector became subsequently known as Polish Livonia or Inflanty; it was settled with colonists from Poland proper resulting in systematic polonisation of these lands.

Northern Seven Years' War

When the Kalmar Union between Sweden and Denmark was disbanded in 1523 due to Swedish resentment of Danish tyranny, Baltic trade became threatened. The port city of Gdańsk (Danzig), Poland's wealthiest city, faced difficulties due to ongoing conflict on the sea and piracy. The capital, Kraków, was also affected as the trade route from the Baltic ran through Gdańsk and along the Vistula River to the southern province of Lesser Poland. Gdańsk, which was privileged with its own army and government, resisted against Sigismund's order of sending privateers and creating the first Polish Admiralty in their city. Most of the deputies in the city council were merchants and tradesmen of German descent or Protestants who were either politically leaning towards Sweden or fighting for the status of an independent 'city state'. 11 Polish privateers sent by Sigismund were eventually executed, which greatly angered the king. Poland then joined Denmark against Sweden for Baltic domination.

The war ended as status quo ante bellum in 1570 with the Treaty of Stettin, which was signed by Bishop Martin Kromer on behalf of Sigismund. However, the ineffective conflict did have its input in establishing Poland's first registered naval fleet (Naval Commission) in 1568.

Union of Lublin

Sigismund's most striking legacy may have been the Union of Lublin, which united Poland and Lithuania into one state, the Polish–Lithuanian Commonwealth, jointly with German-speaking Royal Prussia and Prussian cities. This achievement might well have been impossible without the monarch's personal approach to politics and ability to mediate.

At first, the treaty was perceived as a threat to Lithuanian sovereignty. Lithuanian magnates were afraid of losing their powers, since the proposed union would lower their rank and status to an equivalent with petty nobility rather than wealthier Polish aristocracy. On the other hand, the unification would provide a strong alliance against Russian (Muscovite) attack from the east. Lithuania was ravaged by the Muscovite-Lithuanian Wars which endured for over 150 years. During the Second War, Lithuania lost  of its territory to Russia, and the final defeat in the Livonian War would result in the country's incorporation into the Russian Tsardom. Furthermore, the Poles were reluctant to aid Lithuania without a quid pro quo. The most vocal opponent of the union was Sigismund's brother-in-law, Mikołaj "the Red" Radziwiłł, who viewed the agreement as "peaceful annexation of Lithuania" by Poland. He also resisted polonisation policies which forced ethnic Lithuanians to change their names and native language to Polish or Latin.

As another war with Russia loomed, Sigismund Augustus pressed the members of parliament (Sejm) for the union, gradually gaining more followers due to his persuasive abilities and auspicious diplomacy. The potential union agreement would lead to the eviction of Lithuanian landowners who opposed the transition of territory from multi-ethnic Lithuania to Poland. Such terms were causing an outrage among the most renowned members of Lithuanian upper classes, but Sigismund was decisive and ruthless in this matter. Moreover, the personal union between the two countries created by the marriage of Jadwiga with Jogaila in 1385 was not entirely constitutional. Being the last male member of the Jagiellons, childless Sigismund sought to preserve his dynasty's legacy. The newly proposed constitutional union would create one large Commonwealth state, with one elected monarch who would simultaneously reign over both domains.

The initial Sejm negotiations on unity in January 1569, near the Polish city of Lublin, were futile. The right of Poles to settle and own land in the Grand Duchy was questioned by Lithuanian envoys. Following Mikołaj Radziwiłł's departure from Lublin on 1 March 1569, Sigismund announced the incorporation of then-Lithuanian Podlachia, Volhynia, Podolia and Kiev provinces into Poland, with strong approval from the local Ruthenian (Ukrainian) gentry. Those historic regions, which once belonged to the Kievan Rus', were disputed between Lithuania and Russia. However, the Ruthenian nobles were eager to capitalise on the political or economic potential offered by the Polish sphere and agreed to the terms. Previously, the Kingdom of Ruthenia or "Ukraine" was abolished in 1349, after Poland and Lithuania split modern-day Ukraine in the aftermath of the Galicia–Volhynia Wars. Now, under the Union of Lublin, all Ukrainian and Ruthenian territories which were alien in culture, customs, religion and language to the Polish people would be annexed by Catholic Poland. Strong westernisation and polonisation would follow, including the clandestine suppression of the Ukrainian Eastern Orthodox Church by future king Sigismund III. Ruthenia remained under Polish rule until the Cossack uprisings against Polish domination and the Partitions of Poland, when Ukraine was annexed by the Russian Empire.

The Lithuanians were compelled to return to the Sejm negotiations under Jan Hieronim Chodkiewicz and continue negotiations. The Polish nobility once again pressed for the full incorporation of the Grand Duchy of Lithuania into Poland, however, the Lithuanians disapproved. The parties eventually agreed on a federal state on 28 June 1569 and on 1 July 1569 the Union of Lublin was signed at Lublin Castle, thus establishing the Polish–Lithuanian Commonwealth. Sigismund Augustus ratified the unification act on 4 July, and henceforth governed one of the largest and multicultural countries of 16th-century Europe.

Religion

In comparison to his staunchly Catholic father, Sigismund Augustus paid little attention to the matters of faith and religion. Having a large number of mistresses before, during and after being married, he was viewed by the clergy as an adulterer and libertine. Sigismund was also reasonably tolerant towards minorities and supported nobles of different faith and nationality to be part of the national assembly, the Sejm. He continued his father's policies, but was more accepting of the Protestant Reformation in Poland (only to the status of a minority religion). Several magnates converted to Calvinism or Lutheranism during the Reformation started by Martin Luther and John Calvin, most notably Stanisław Zamoyski, Jan Zamoyski, Mikołaj Rej, Andrzej Frycz Modrzewski, Johannes a Lasco (Jan Łaski) and Mikołaj "the Black" Radziwiłł.

Throughout the 16th century, Frycz Modrzewski advocated for renouncing Rome's authority and establishing a separate and independent Polish Church. His initiative was chiefly inspired by the creation of the Anglican Church by Henry VIII in 1534. Sigismund Augustus was lenient towards the idea, particularly due to the sudden spread of Protestantism among courtiers, advisors, nobles and peasants. Calvinism became especially popular among the upper classes as it promoted democratic freedoms and called for rebellion against absolutism, which the privileged Polish nobility favoured. During the 1555 Sejm session in Piotrków, the nobles intensively discussed the rights of priests in the newly proposed Polish Church and demanded the abolition of celibacy. Some Catholic bishops were supportive of the concepts and acknowledged the need for uniting Poland, Lithuania, Prussia and their vassals under a common religion. Sigismund agreed to the postulates, however, under the condition that Pope Paul IV will be in favour. Instead, Paul IV was enraged that such a proposition emerged for him to accept; he declined and refused to grant consent. Facing potential excommunication, the assembly were forced to abandon their plans. Nevertheless, Protestantism continued to flourish and spread. In 1565, the Polish Brethren came into existence as a Nontrinitarian sect of Calvinism.

One year after Sigismund's death the Warsaw Confederation was adopted as the first European act granting religious freedoms. Despite this, Protestantism in Poland ultimately declined during the fierce Counter-Reformation measures under the despotic and arch-Catholic Sigismund III Vasa, who ruled for nearly 45 years. For instance, the Polish Brethren were banned, hunted down and its leaders executed.

Patronage

Sigismund Augustus carried on with the development of several royal residencies including Wawel, Vilnius Castle, Niepołomice and the Royal Castle in Warsaw. In the 1560s he acquired the Tykocin Castle and rebuilt it in Renaissance style. During the reign of Sigismund Augustus the structure served as a royal residence with an impressive treasury and library as well as the main arsenal of the crown.

Sigismund Augustus was a passionate collector of jewels and gemstones. According to nuncio Bernardo Bongiovanni's relation, his collection was cached in 16 chests. Among the precious items in his possession was Charles V's ruby of 80,000 scudos' worth, as well as the Emperor's diamond medal with Habsburgs Eagle on one side and two columns with a sign Plus Ultra on the other side. In 1571, after the death of his nephew John Sigismund Zápolya, he inherited the Hungarian Crown used by some Hungarian monarchs. A Swedish Crown was also made for him. The Polish king treated those crowns as a family keepsake, and kept them in a private vault in the Tykocin Castle. He had also a sultan's sword of 16,000 ducats' worth, 30 precious horse trappings and 20 different private-use armours. The king's possession included a rich collection of tapestries (360 pieces), commissioned by him in Brussels in the years 1550–1560.

The king enjoyed reading, especially short stories, poems and satires. Under the influence of bishop Piotr Myszkowski, Poland's then greatest writer and poet Jan Kochanowski joined the royal court in 1563. It is uncertain whether Sigismund and Kochanowski were friends, however, Kochanowski's correspondence clearly highlights that the two had close contact and he assisted the monarch at most important occasions, including military maneuvers in Lithuania in 1567. Kochanowski was also present during the signing of Lublin Union in 1569.

Sigismund was fond of foreign craft-makers and employed Italian goldsmiths, jewellers and medalists, very much like his father. One of the more renowned figures brought to Poland was Giovanni Jacopo Caraglio. In Italy, Caraglio was one of the first reproductive printmakers. In Poland, Sigismund tasked him with the production of cameos, medallions, coins and jewellery. Numerous medals and roundels from this period feature the last members of the Jagiellonian dynasty. When Sigismund's mother Bona died in 1557, Sigismund had to collect his inheritance from the Italian estates. On 18 October 1558, the king granted the right to arrange the first regular Polish postal service operating from Kraków to Venice, thus establishing Poczta Polska (Polish Post). All maintenance costs were borne by the Crown and the post was mostly managed by Italians or Germans. Additional couriers travelled between Kraków, Warsaw and Vilnius. Since 1562, the postal route also encompassed Vienna and cities in the Holy Roman Empire, which enabled continuous correspondence with the Habsburgs.

In 1573, the first permanent bridge over the Vistula River in Warsaw and also the longest wooden bridge in Europe at the time was named in Sigismund's honour.

Royal titles
 Royal titles, in Latin: "Sigismundus Augustus, Dei gratia rex Poloniae, magnus dux Lithuaniae, nec non terrarum Cracoviae, Sandomiriae, Siradiae, Lanciciae, Cuiaviae, Kiioviae, dominus hereditarius Russiae, Woliniae, Prussiae, Masoviae, Podlachiae, Culmensis, Elbingensis, Pomeraniae, Samogitiae, Livoniae etc. dominus et heres."
 English translation: "Sigismund Augustus, by the Grace of God, King of Poland, Grand Duke of Lithuania, Lord and heir of the Lands of Kraków, Sandomierz, Sieradz, Łęczyca, Kuyavia, Kiev, Hereditary Lord of Ruthenia, Volhynia, Prussia, Masovia, Podlaskie, Culmer Land, Elbing, Pomerania, Samogitia, Livonia etc. Lord and heir"

Ancestry

See also
 History of Poland (1385–1569)
 History of Poland (1569–1795)
 List of Polish monarchs

Citations and references

Cited sources

External links

|-

|-

1520 births
1572 deaths
16th-century Polish monarchs
Burials at Wawel Cathedral
Grand Dukes of Lithuania
Jagiellonian dynasty
People from Knyszyn
Nobility from Kraków
Polish Roman Catholics
People of the Northern Seven Years' War